The SIU Edwardsville Cougars softball team represents Southern Illinois University Edwardsville in NCAA Division I college softball. They compete as members of the Ohio Valley Conference. SIUE plays its home games at Cougar Field, located in the southwest corner of the campus.

History
Sources:

Through 2018, the SIUE softball team had had only two head coaches in its history.

The program was begun by Cindy Jones in 1974–75. In fourteen seasons, Jones' teams were 376–201, with two trips to the Association for Intercollegiate Athletics for Women Division II National Tournament and two invitations to the NCAA Division II Softball Championship tournament while competing as a Division II independent.

Coach Sandy Montgomery took over the Cougars in 1989, with SIUE continuing as an independent and earning its third invitation to the Division II playoffs before joining the Great Lakes Valley Conference (GLVC) in 1996. In thirteen seasons as members of the GLVC, the Cougars won or shared seven regular season division or conference titles and five conference tournament championships. They earned ten trips to the NCAA Division II playoffs, including two spots in the Division II College World Series, and won the NCAA Division II National Softball Championship in 2007.

In 2008–09, SIUE athletics began the transition into Division I, and the Cougars joined the Ohio Valley Conference (OVC) in 2011.

On April 9, 2014, the Cougars defeated the Saint Louis Billikens 4–1 at SLU. The win was Coach Sandy Montgomery's 900th coaching win, making her the 39th coach in NCAA softball history to reach that milestone. Coach Montgomery's record since assuming the reins in 1989 through the end of the 2014 regular season is 914–462–2.

On May 10, 2014, the softball Cougars became the first  SIUE team to win an OVC championship in any sport. Rain and thunderstorms shortened the tournament, played at University Field at Jacksonville State, with the losers bracket being cancelled, while the 2nd seeded Cougars and the 4th seeded Murray State Racers were the last two undefeated teams. The Cougars scored early, with four home runs in the first two innings, and defeated the Racers 12–1, with the game halted after 6 innings by the mercy rule. The squad also became the first SIUE team to qualify for an NCAA Division I tournament since the 1982 men's soccer team, when that sport had been the university's only Division I program before the school's transition to Division I for all sports began in 2008.

In late July 2018, Sandy Montgomery suddenly announced her early retirement.  Assistant coach Jessica Jones was named as interim head coach for the 2019 season.

On August 24, 2022, Coach Ben Sorden was named the new Cougars head softball coach.

Records by year

All–Americans
Through the years, fifteen Cougar softball players were named Division II All–Americans:

1981 – Denise Schaake
1982 – Amy Frey
1984 – Kathy Byrne

1988 – Laura McCune
1991 – Michele Cleeton
2000 – Erin Newman & Katie Waldo

2001 – Valerie McCoy & Erin Newman
2002 – Valerie McCoy
2003 – Jenny Esker & Holly Neuerburg

2006 – Alicia DeShasier & Sabra McCune
2007 – Kaitlin Colosimo

In 2017, Haley Chambers-Book''' became the Cougars' first Division I All-American.

References

External links